83rd Street may refer to:

Chicago
83rd Street (Avalon Park) station
83rd Street (Metra station)

Elsewhere
83rd Street (Manhattan), New York City